Jalwehra, commonly known as Jalerha, is a village in Hoshiarpur, Punjab. Its population in 2011 census was 616  of which 310 are males while 306 are females. Average Sex Ratio of Jalwehra village is 987 which is higher than Punjab state average of 895. Child Sex Ratio for the Jalwehra as per census is 1000, higher than Punjab average of 846. Jalwehra village has higher literacy rate compared to Punjab. In 2011, literacy rate of Jalwehra village was 82.22% compared to 75.84% of Punjab. In Jalwehra Male literacy stands at 89.86% while female literacy rate was 74.47%.

Its area 1.35 square kilometres. The surrounding villages are: Panchhat, Narur, Nasirabad (Shekhpur), Toderpur, Nanglan, Thindlan & Chairan. The nearest road is Panchhat-Phagwara which is 2 km long. The nearest railway station is Phagwara 23 km away. The post-office of Jalwehra is in Toderpur. Jalwehra was established in the census of 1800. The village is famous for many persons; are lots North America. The most people of Jalwehra are to be found in Canada.

The village is near the famous village Panchhat. So most facilities are nearby in Panchhat has 2 hospitals as well as 4-5 schools/institutes.

Etymology
In the rainy season, the village remained full of water for many days. That is why their village began to be called "Jalwehra" the terrace of water. Jalwehra comes from two Punjabi words: Jal (water) and Wehra (terrace or courtyard).

Gurudwara's
There are 2 Gurdwara's in the village, SGPC Gurudwara and Gurdwara Samadhan.

External links
 Sikh Rajput, Official website
  Pind Jalwehra Website

Cities and towns in Hoshiarpur district